Oddloop is an EP album by Japanese rock band Frederic. It was released on September 23, 2014 and was also their debut at a major record label, peaking at number 73 on the Japanese charts.  It won the Kansai block local award at the 7th CD Shop Awards.

It features the song, "Oddloop", whose name is a mixture between the Japanese verb odoru, meaning "to dance", and the English words "odd loop." The music video references this loop in its strange repeating sequences. It is their most popular song, with over 100 million views on YouTube as of January 2022. The two women dancers in the music video are Yuho Uchida, and Arisu Mukaide.

References

External links 
 "Oddloop" Music Video on YouTube

2014 EPs
Frederic (band) albums
Japanese-language EPs
A-Sketch EPs